Racetrack is a census-designated place (CDP) in Powell County, Montana, United States. It contains the unincorporated communities of Racetrack and Dempsey. It is on the southern edge of Powell County, bordered to the south by Deer Lodge County. Interstate 90 passes through Racetrack, with access from Exit 195. I-90 leads south and east  to Butte and north  to Deer Lodge, the Powell county seat.

The Clark Fork river forms the eastern edge of the Racetrack CDP. Racetrack Creek, rising to the west in the Flint Creek Range, flows through the northern part of the CDP before joining the Clark Fork.

Racetrack was first listed as a CDP prior to the 2020 census.

Demographics

References 

Census-designated places in Powell County, Montana
Census-designated places in Montana